Keith Payne,  (born 30 August 1933) is an Australian recipient of the Victoria Cross, the highest decoration for gallantry "in the presence of the enemy" awarded to members of the British and Commonwealth armed forces. Payne's VC was awarded for his actions during the Vietnam War. Aged , he is the last living Australian recipient of the original "Imperial" Victoria Cross.

Early life
Keith Payne was born at Ingham, Queensland, on 30 August 1933, the son of Romilda (Millie) Hussey and Henry Thomas Payne. He attended Ingham State School and later became an apprentice cabinet-maker. Dissatisfied with working as a tradesman, Payne joined the Australian Regular Army in August 1951 and, after brief period in the Citizen Military Forces (CMF), was posted to the 2nd Battalion, Royal Australian Regiment (2RAR) the following year transferred to the 1st Battalion, Royal Australian Regiment (1RAR).

Military career
Payne served with his unit in the Korean War from April 1952 to March 1953. He married Florence Plaw, a member of the Women's Royal Australian Army Corps, in December 1954, and was promoted to corporal the following year. Payne served in Malaya with this unit and in 1965, now a sergeant, he joined the 5th Battalion. In June 1965, by now a warrant officer class II, Payne was a fieldcraft instructor on the staff of the Officer Training Unit, Scheyville, established to commission national servicemen. In February 1967 he was posted to Papua New Guinea, where he served with the 2nd Battalion, Pacific Islands Regiment. He remained there until March 1968 when he returned to Brisbane. On 24 February 1969 he was posted to the Australian Army Training Team Vietnam (AATTV).

In May 1969 Payne was commanding the 212th Company of the 1st Mobile Strike Force Battalion, when it was attacked by a strong People's Army of Vietnam force near Ben Het Camp. The company was isolated and, surrounded on three sides, its Vietnamese troops began to fall back. At this point shrapnel from a grenade burst struck Payne, lodging in his skull, arms and hands; under heavy fire, Payne covered the withdrawal before organising his troops into a defensive perimeter. Disregarding his own serious wounds, he then returned to the battlefield and spent a further three hours, frequently under fire, searching for any remaining members of his unit. Payne located about 40 of his men, most of them wounded; he assisted some of the wounded himself and organised assistance for others, before leading the party back to base through an area now dominated by enemy forces.

Payne's actions that night earned him the Victoria Cross (VC), which was gazetted on 19 September 1969. He was evacuated to Brisbane in September suffering from an illness, receiving a warm reception at the airport before entering hospital. In January 1970 Payne was posted to the Royal Military College, Duntroon as an instructor.

Payne received his VC from Queen Elizabeth II aboard the Royal Yacht Britannia in Brisbane on 13 April 1970. He was made a freeman of the city and of the shire in which his hometown was located. A park in Stafford, Brisbane, (where Payne lived) was also named after him. He also received the Distinguished Service Cross and the Silver Star from the United States of America and the Republic of Vietnam awarded Payne the Vietnam Gallantry Cross with Bronze Star.

Payne was later posted to the 42nd Battalion, Royal Queensland Regiment. He retired from the Australian Army in 1975, but saw further action as a captain with the Army of the Sultan of Oman against communist forces in the Dhofar War in 1975 and 1976.

Later life
Payne joined the Legion of Frontiersmen in 1975 and holds the rank of an Honorary Chief Commissioner. After returning to Australia, he became active in the veteran community, particularly in counselling sufferers of post-traumatic stress disorder.

Payne and his wife raised five sons and live in Mackay, Queensland. He was awarded the Medal of the Order of Australia (OAM) for his service to the veteran community in 2006, while Flo Payne was recognised with an OAM for her service to the community, particularly through surf lifesaving and veteran's families, in 2011.

Payne was interviewed for the 2006 television docudrama Victoria Cross Heroes, which also included archive footage and dramatisations of his actions.

In September 2012 Payne became a Patron of the Victoria Cross Trust. The mental health ward at Greenslopes Private Hospital in Brisbane is named the Keith Payne Unit (KPU), in his honour.

Payne was advanced to a Member of the Order of Australia in June 2015. The award recognised his "significant service to veterans and their families as an ambassador, patron and as an advocate for veterans' health and welfare."

Payne is a patron of Australians for Constitutional Monarchy.

Honours and awards

Unit awards

Notes
Footnotes

Citations

References

External links
WOII K. Payne, VC AATTV Association — biography plus detailed action account.
Warrant Officer Class 2 Keith Payne, VC AWM Who's who in Australian Military History.
Interview with Keith Payne Australians at War Film Archive.
RSL defends veteran over VC sale, ABC News, 20 June 2007, www.abc.net.au
Keith Payne medal exhibit Maryborough Military & Colonial Museum: Keith and his medals; Closer view of Keith's medals; Pictures and Certificates
Keith Payne, 2002, 40th Anniversary Reunion, Australian Army Training Team Vietnam
Keith Payne and Edward Kenna, the last two living Australian VC recipients, 15 April 2003.
Keith Payne and Mark Donaldson, the last Australian Victoria Cross recipient with the first Victoria Cross for Australia recipient at Government House, January 2009.

1933 births
Living people
Military personnel from Queensland
People from North Queensland
Australian Army soldiers
Australian cabinetmakers
Australian military personnel of the Korean War
Australian military personnel of the Malayan Emergency
Australian military personnel of the Vietnam War
Legion of Frontiersmen members
People of the Dhofar Rebellion
Australian recipients of the Victoria Cross
Vietnam War recipients of the Victoria Cross
Recipients of the Centenary Medal
Recipients of the Distinguished Service Cross (United States)
Members of the Order of Australia
Foreign recipients of the Silver Star
Recipients of the Gallantry Cross (Vietnam)